Adler & Allan Group specialises in environmental clean-up operations. It was founded in 1926.

In 2006 Adler and Allan were employed by Total to clear the Buncefield fire site.

In 2014 it ranked number 31 in the Sunday Times’ list of Britain’s fastest-growing private companies.

Following Storm Desmond and Storm Eva, Adler & Allan who were involved in the clean-up operation, won The Barclays Award for Building Resilient Business at the 2017 Business in the Community Responsible Business Awards in recognition of its flood response and recovery program in Cumbria.

References

External links
Official site

Companies based in Harrogate